A monarch is the leader of a monarchy, a position usually intended to last for life or until abdication or deposition. The reign of some monarchs have been notably short. Many of these monarchs acceded to the throne as a result of being first in an order of succession, while other monarchs claimed the throne as a result of conflict. The authenticity of some monarchs has been disputed, especially those who reigned during conflict. One factor in such debates is whether the monarch held the throne in a symbolic or nominal capacity.

Monarchs who reigned for less than a day

Monarchs who reigned for less than a week

Other monarchs who reigned for less than a month

Other monarchs who reigned for less than three months

Other monarchs who reigned for less than six months

Other monarchs who reigned for a year or less

Other monarchs that could have reigned for less than a year
The following monarchs may also have reigned for less than a year, but only an approximate length of reign is known.

See also
 List of current reigning monarchs by length of reign
 List of longest-reigning monarchs
 List of shortest-reigning popes
 List of the oldest living state leaders
 Pedro Lascuráin, the shortest-ruling President
 Records of heads of state
 Saul Wahl, legendary King of Poland for one day

Notes

References

 Shortest
Shortest reigning monarchs of all time